The World is a 2004 Chinese drama written and directed by Jia Zhangke about the work and the life of several young people moving from the countryside to a world park. Starring Jia's muse, Zhao Tao, as well as Cheng Taishen, The World was filmed on and around an actual theme park located in Beijing, Beijing World Park, which recreates world landmarks at reduced scales for Chinese tourists. The World introduces new technologies like binoculars, coin-operated telescopes, digital cameras, mobile phones and digital services in the theme park as touristic tools to virtually travel around the world, emphasizing the globalization and convenience. It is a metaphor for Chinese society to experience the sense of mobility, but the knowledge is still limited domestically and the environment of simulation is seen as a sense of escaping from the real world.
The World was Jia's first film to gain official approval from the Chinese government. Additionally, it was the first of his films to take place outside of his home province of Shanxi.

The film premiered in competition at the 2004 Venice Film Festival on September 4, 2004, but failed to win the coveted Golden Lion, the festival's top award, which ultimately went to Mike Leigh's drama Vera Drake, but which Jia would win two years later with Still Life. The World also premiered in 2004 at the New York Film Festival and would go on to receive a limited release in New York City the following year on July 1, 2005.

Plot 
At Beijing World Park, performer Tao (Zhao Tao) is visited by her ex-boyfriend en route to Ulan Batur. Her boyfriend Taisheng, a security guard, meets them and insists on driving him to the Beijing railway station. Taisheng, frustrated that Tao refuses to have sex with him, is also busy with fellow migrants from his home province of Shanxi. Chen Zhijun is an introverted childhood friend of Taisheng's who has just arrived at the park; he eventually becomes a construction worker.

Tao, meanwhile, meets Anna, one of the World Park's Russian performers. Though Anna speaks no Chinese, and Tao no Russian, the two become unlikely friends. Anna confesses to Tao that she will quit her job and implies that she must prostitute herself in order to make enough money to see her sister, also in Ulan Batur. Later, Tao runs into Anna and it is clear that she has indeed become a prostitute. Anna runs away and Tao cries. Meanwhile, Taisheng is asked by an associate to drive a woman named Qun to Taiyuan so she can deal with her gambling brother, and he eventually becomes attracted to her. The two often meet at her clothing shop, where she tells him about her husband who left for France years ago. Since, she has tried with some difficulty to obtain a visa to join him. Though he pursues her, Qun rejects him.

Taisheng eventually convinces Tao to have sex with him, with Tao threatening that she will kill him if he ever betrays her. His life, however, quickly spirals out of control when Chen is killed in a construction accident. Some time afterwards, Wei and Niu, two other performers at World Park, announce that they plan to wed despite Niu being dangerously jealous and unstable. At the wedding, Tao discovers a text-message from Qun, who has at last received her visa, to Taisheng, saying that their meeting and relationship was destined. Believing that Taisheng has indeed betrayed her, Tao is devastated and cuts off contact with him while she house-sits for Wei and Niu. When Taisheng goes to visit her, she ignores him. Some time later, Taisheng and Tao have succumbed to a gas leak, presumably in their friends' apartment. As the film fades to black, Taisheng's voice asks, "Are we dead?" "No," Tao's voice responds, "this is only the beginning."

Cast
Zhao Tao as Tao, the film's heroine, a young woman and a performer at the Beijing World Park.
Chen Taisheng as Taisheng, a Shanxi-native who has lived in Beijing for three years. Taisheng has become something of a fixture for Shanxi migrants who come to him looking for a place to work.
Jing Jue as Wei, one of Tao's fellow performers.
Jiang Zhongwei as Niu, another performer and Wei's possessive and paranoid boyfriend.
Huang Yiqun as Qun, a native of Wenzhou, Qun operates a clothing shop, Taisheng's mistress.
Wang Hongwei as Sanlai, a friend of Taisheng's and another Shanxi native.
Ji Shuai as Erxiao, a Shanxi native and Taisheng's cousin, whom Taisheng has gotten a job as a security guard at World Park. Erxiao is later fired for stealing from the performers while they are on stage.
Xiang Wan as Youyou, another performer, Youyou carries on an affair with the park's director and parleys it into a promotion to troupe director.
Alla Shcherbakova as Anna, a Russian immigrant and performer at World Park.
Han Sanming as Sanming, a relative of Little Sister who comes to Beijing after his death to help his family collect compensation. Sanming reappears in Still Life, Jia's follow-up to The World, this time as a lead actor.

Production
The World was a joint-production by Jia Zhangke's own Xstream Pictures, Japan's Office Kitano, and France's Lumen Films. It received additional financial support from the Shanghai Film Studio and several Japanese corporations including Bandai Visual and Tokyo FM, among others.

The film's nascence began after Jia had lived in Beijing for several years in 2000. After two films based in his native province of Shanxi, Jia decided to make a film about his impressions of Beijing as a world city, after a cousin back home asked him about life in a metropolitan environment. Jia, however, would not began writing the screenplay until after the release of his next film Unknown Pleasures, in 2003 during the SARS outbreak. The screenplay took approximately a year to write, over which time the story slowly changed, such that it became harder to distinguish the fact that it took place in Beijing, and the focus of the setting shifted to that of any large city with many migrants in it. Filming of The World took place on location at the actual Beijing World Park, as well as at an older but similar park, Window of the World, that sometimes served as a stand-in and is located in the southern city of Shenzhen.

The World sets the scene in a World park in Beijing, the capital of China, to present China’s desires and ongoing process of becoming a new global center, and the famous buildings from different countries of smaller sizes are to show a united and harmonious world. Jia is a migrant from Fenyang, Shanxi to Beijing, in his interview he said he “wants to focus on my viewpoint on big cities”. This miniature of a world inside the park presents the migrants wave as a significant global issue.

Legitimization 
As Jia Zhangke's first film made with the consent of the Chinese Film Bureau, many felt that Jia's hand would be unduly restricted by Communist bureaucrats. As it turned out, Jia claimed that the main impact of government approval was the ability to screen abroad and at home without major obstacles; Jia stated that,  Jia attributed the loosening of restrictions as part of the Film Bureau's overall liberalization and acceptance of so-called "outside directors." Outside observers agreed with Jia's assessment, dismissing claims that Jia had compromised his principles and "sold out." One definite result of working within the system, however, was that the film became much easier to produce, as Jia no longer had to worry about interference from the central government or from local officials.

In Mainland China, directors who insisted on independent views and productions were banned from making films. Despite his director status being banned by the Chinese government in 1999, he persisted to make films. In 2004, he was the first banned director to be reinstated after years of campaigning. Advocations by the film industry were one of the reasons that led the Chinese government to reconsider the functions and role of moves as an economic tool.

Jia’s first two films (Xiao Shan Go Home and Pickpocket) were primarily self-funded. He gained recognition after winning awards at Berlin, Vancouver and Nantes. His third film Platform received private funding from Pusan, and his next film Unknown Pleasure was also privately funded with support from international companies. Although raising funds was challenging for him, Jia was able to produce and control his films. When The World was being made, Jia finally received national funding from The Shanghai Film Group along with other companies around the world. The World is his first above-ground film, and with support and funding from China, he was finally approved and recognized as a filmmaker in China.

Creative team 
Jia Zhangke's's primary creative team once again returned for The World, including cinematographer Yu Lik-wai, sound designer Zhang Yang, and production houses Office Kitano and Lumen Films. Also returning was editor Kong Jinglei, who had worked with Jia on Platform and would later work with Jia on Still Life and 24 City. With his core team in place, Jia also brought in several new young assistant directors.

In the cast, Jia brought back Zhao Tao, who had starred in the Jia's previous ensemble pieces Unknown Pleasures and Platform, and would go on to star in both Still Life and 24 City. As usual, Jia also had a small part for his friend and classmate Wang Hongwei, who has been in nearly all of Jia's films since his starring role in the short film Xiao Shan Going Home in 1995, filmed while both were still attending the Beijing Film Academy.

Digital technology and realism 
Unlike Unknown Pleasures, which only had diegetic music, music was an important feature to The World, which featured snippets of the dance performances that were the park's centerpieces. Music played such an important role that the film was almost considered by some to be a musical. Jia brought in the Taiwanese composer Lim Giong, who had previously worked with Hou Hsiao-hsien, to score the film using primarily electronic music. As stated by Jia, the artifice of the electronic music was to "signify the real emptiness of the lives of Tao and her friends. Life’s heaviness fades when confronted by the silky lightness of dance and music." Jia then tied the music to the animated sequences of the film, wherein Tao's inner thoughts were given life, all to create an "Asian digital life." The animated part reflects both the limiting and liberating potential of new technologies and reminds the world that “analog and digital media, realism and simulation, the local and the global, are in fact contemporaneous phenomena”, as the animation in the film blurs the boundaries between the reality and visual fantasy attractions.

The world is shot in digital and is completed with its flash animation, cellphone as a motif, and electronic music. In fact, during the scene where Erguniang dies, the image of writings on the wall from Erguniang is not actually written on the wall but instead shown through a digital effect. According to Cecilia Mello, The World does not provide a clear division between the real world and the digital/artificial world. It rather "point[s] towards a confusion between both, corroborating the point made in the introduction about the coexistence of contraries, so typical of the reality of China's cities."

The circular discourse is not Jia's fundamental device on film making, but the reversal of the gaze. "The possibility to poke holes in the fictional system rests on the filmed subject's response to the enquiring gaze of the filming subject." Based on the transition from the circular. discourse to the reversal of the gaze, Anna and Tao from the film as an example on the response to the enquiring gaze between each other. Two characters supposed to not communicate with each other due to the language difference, however, the gaze helped them to talk and feel each other's pains and worries. Outside the movie, the transition to the gaze can create an emotional appeal to audiences. Factual elements from Jia's movie resists the seduction of a seamlessly real fiction, "you cannot. reveal the world without the world also bearing witness to your presence."

Social issues 
Jia used the created world as people's ideal life, people in the fictional world pretended to be happy. They did not recognize facts and truth between their relationships and real life, but they finally needed to accept the reality that broke their ideal life in the world. It not only demonstrated the phenomenon in the film, but also revealed the issue within the society.  Jia used a film to describe a general social problem on the young generation in the society.

Animation 
Jia Zhangke experimented with computer animation in The World instead of his preferred observational realism style, to reflect on the power as well as limits of the new technologies. In an interview, Jia mentioned that young people in China rely heavily on cell phones and computers these days. He wanted to explore this through the use of animation — specifically, flash animation. With the help of the Chinese animation designer Wang Bo, the animations are used as a form of narration to render details of urban life into poetic illustrations of daydream.

The animations are used with the intention of helping the characters articulate emotions that are difficult or impossible to express in words. Similarity, the virtual love notes are used to portray a shared, private space for the main couple in the film who are unable to achieve this in their daily lives. In this sense, digital technologies provide a temporary reprieve from the character’s harsh realities and allow for interpersonal communication.

Reception 
Domestically, the film was apparently well received among the government officials responsible for its smooth passage through the bureaucratic machine. Abroad, the film was even better received. Four years after its American release, the review aggregators Rotten Tomatoes and Metacritic gave the film rating of 71% (with 30 positive reviews out of 42) and a score of 81 (derived from 23 reviews), respectively. American critics found the film to be a stunning portrayal of the disaffected Chinese society navigating modern urban life with Entertainment Weekly calling the film "a glorious achievement", and The Chicago Reader hailing it as "a tragic, visionary work." Manohla Dargis of The New York Times wrote, after The World's premiere at the New York Film Festival, that the film was a "quietly despairing vision of contemporary China with an almost ethnographic attention to detail" but perhaps had an overly "cavalier attitude to narrative momentum." Variety also gave it a positive review, noting that the film "confirms [Jia] as one of the most interesting and insightful chroniclers of the new China." Criticisms of the film generally revolved around the idea that the film was overly long and meandering (a common criticism of Jia's films, see, for example, Unknown Pleasures). Variety mentioned the overly long complaint in its review, as did the review by Roger Ebert in the Chicago Sun Times (stating that "either you will fall into its rhythm, or you will grow restless"). Dargis, however, had fewer problems with the film's pace and instead felt that Jia's vision was overly insular, "mesmerized" by World Park with only fleeting glimpses of the city beyond.

Top ten lists
Released in 2005 in the United States, The World appeared on many critics' top ten lists of the best films of that year.

1st – Jonathan Rosenbaum, Chicago Reader
2nd – Robert Koehler, Variety
6th – Scott Foundas, LA Weekly
6th – J. Hoberman, Village Voice
6th – Andrew O'Hehir, Salon
6th – Lisa Schwarzbaum, Entertainment Weekly
7th – Ella Taylor, LA Weekly, tied with 2046 and Tropical Malady
10th – Michael Atkinson, Village Voice
10th – Dennis Lim, Village Voice, tied with Darwin's Nightmare, Mondovino, and Chain
[Listed alphabetically] – Peter Rainer, Christian Science Monitor

See also
 Beijing World Park

References

External links

Films set in amusement parks
2004 films
2004 drama films
2000s Mandarin-language films
2000s Russian-language films
Films set in Beijing
Films directed by Jia Zhangke
Films with live action and animation
Films about virginity
Chinese drama films